Grindelia aggregata is a rare North American species of flowering plants in the family Asteraceae. It is native to western Canada, found only in salt marshes and tidal flats along the seacoast in the southern part of Vancouver Island in British Columbia.

References

External links
photo of herbarium specimen at Missouri Botanical Garden, collected in British Columbia in 1903, holotype of Grindelia aggregata

aggregata
Flora of British Columbia
Salt marsh plants
Plants described in 1934
Flora without expected TNC conservation status